Grateful Dead Records Collection is a box set of albums by the rock band the Grateful Dead.  It contains four albums on five LPs.  The albums were previously released by the band's own record company, Grateful Dead Records.  They were remastered for the box set, and pressed on 180-gram vinyl.  The albums included in the box set are Wake of the Flood (originally released in 1973), From the Mars Hotel (1974), Blues for Allah (1975), and Steal Your Face (a live double album recorded in 1974 and released in 1976).

Grateful Dead Records Collection was released on November 24, 2017, as part of Record Store Day Black Friday.  Subsequently, the box set was made available as a digital download.

Track listing

Wake of the Flood 
Wake of the Flood
Side 1
"Mississippi Half-Step Uptown Toodeloo" (Jerry Garcia, Robert Hunter)
"Let Me Sing Your Blues Away" (Keith Godchaux, Hunter)
"Row Jimmy" (Garcia, Hunter)
"Stella Blue" (Garcia, Hunter)
Side 2
"Here Comes Sunshine" (Garcia, Hunter)
"Eyes of the World" (Garcia, Hunter)
"Weather Report Suite"
"Prelude" (Bob Weir)
"Part I" (Weir, Eric Andersen)
"Part II (Let It Grow)" (Weir, John Perry Barlow)

From the Mars Hotel 
From the Mars Hotel
Side 1
"U.S. Blues" (Garcia, Hunter)
"China Doll" (Garcia, Hunter)
"Unbroken Chain" (Phil Lesh, Robert Petersen)
"Loose Lucy" (Garcia, Hunter)
Side 2
"Scarlet Begonias" (Garcia, Hunter)
"Pride of Cucamonga" (Lesh, Petersen)
"Money Money" (Weir, Barlow)
"Ship of Fools" (Garcia, Hunter)

Blues for Allah 
Blues for Allah
Side 1
"Help on the Way" (Garcia, Hunter)
"Slipknot!" (Garcia, Godchaux, Bill Kreutzmann, Lesh, Weir)
"Franklin's Tower" (Garcia, Kreutzmann, Hunter)
"King Solomon's Marbles" (Lesh)
"Stronger Than Dirt or Milkin' the Turkey" (Mickey Hart, Kreutzmann, Lesh)
"The Music Never Stopped" (Weir, Barlow)
Side 2
"Crazy Fingers" (Garcia, Hunter)
"Sage & Spirit" (Weir)
"Blues for Allah" (Garcia, Hunter)
"Sand Castles & Glass Camels" (Garcia, Godchaux, Hart, Kreutzmann, Lesh, Weir)
"Unusual Occurrences in the Desert" (Garcia, Hunter)

Steal Your Face 
Steal Your Face
Side 1
"Promised Land" (Chuck Berry)
"Cold Rain and Snow" (traditional, arranged by Grateful Dead)
"Around and Around" (Berry)
"Stella Blue" (Garcia, Hunter)
Side 2
"Mississippi Half-Step Uptown Toodeloo" (Garcia, Hunter)
"Ship of Fools" (Garcia, Hunter)
"Beat It On Down the Line" (Jesse Fuller)
Side 3
"Big River" (Johnny Cash)
"Black-Throated Wind" (Weir, Barlow)
"U.S. Blues" (Garcia, Hunter)
"El Paso" (Marty Robbins)
Side 4
"Sugaree" (Garcia, Hunter)
"It Must Have Been the Roses" (Hunter)
"Casey Jones" (Garcia, Hunter)

Personnel 
Grateful Dead
Jerry Garcia – guitar, vocals
Bob Weir – guitar, vocals
Phil Lesh – bass, vocals
Keith Godchaux – keyboards
Donna Jean Godchaux – vocals
Bill Kreutzmann – drums
Mickey Hart – drums on Blues for Allah

Box set production
Produced by Grateful Dead
Produced for release by David Lemieux
Mastering: David Glasser
Lacquer cutting: Chris Bellman
Plangent Processes wow and flutter reduction: Jamie Howarth

References 

Grateful Dead compilation albums
Rhino Records compilation albums
2017 compilation albums